Shkëlqim Muça (born 19 March 1960) is an Albanian football coach and former player.

Playing career

Club
He created the attacking trio Muça-Minga-Kola at Nëntori Tirana that was probably the best and most prolific attacking trio in the Albanian football at all times. All three players combined have scored around 400 goals for Tirana in little more than a decade.

Muça has won several championships and Albanian cups with Tirana as a footballer and as a coach.

International
He made his debut for Albania in an September 1982 European Championship qualification match away at Austria and earned a total of 16 caps, scoring 2 goals. He played in the famous December 1984 home win over Belgium and his final international was an October 1987 European Championship qualification match against Romania.

Legacy
He will be remembered by football fans as one of the finest Albanian footballers of the 1980s, skillful with the ball, but also distinguished as an extraordinary assist man, and a strong shooter. Muça's skills have been shown many times on the pitch: he could play in the center or the right side of the midfield.

Managerial career
Muça has had one of the most successful coaching careers in the post '90 footballistic Albania, first as Tirana and Dinamo then as Flamurtari Vlorë coach.

He obtained the FIFA coaching license in May 2008.

Director career
In December 2015, Muça was employed as club chief by Partizani Tirana.

Honours

Player
Tirana
Albanian Superliga: 1981–82, 1984–85, 1987–88, 1988–89
Albanian Cup: 1982–83, 1983–84

Manager
Tirana
Albanian Superliga: 1994–95, 1995–96, 1998–99, 1999–2000, 2002–03, 2003–04, 2004–05, 2006–07
Albanian Cup: 1995–96, 2000–01, 2001–02, 2005–06

Dinamo Tirana
Albanian Superliga: 2009–10

Skënderbeu Korçë
Albanian Superliga: 2010–11

References

External links

1960 births
Living people
Footballers from Tirana
Albanian footballers
Association football midfielders
Albania international footballers
KF Tirana players
Albanian football managers
KF Tirana managers
KF Teuta Durrës managers
Besa Kavajë managers
FK Dinamo Tirana managers
KF Skënderbeu Korçë managers
Flamurtari Vlorë managers
FK Kukësi managers
Kategoria Superiore managers